Jet Ng (born 10 May 1998) is a Singaporean foil fencer.

Career
Ng attained a 5th-place finish at the 2015 Cadet World Championships (men's foil), the then-highest achieved by a Singaporean fencer, before Ywen Lau won the 2016 Cadet World Championships in Women's Sabre. He won multiple Cadet (U17) and Junior (U20) medals in Asian and Southeast Asian competitions.

Ng made his SEA Games debut in 2017, winning an individual bronze medal in the men's foil individual event. In 2019, Ng won the gold medal at the men's foil team event at the 2019 Southeast Asian Games held in the Philippines.

Personal life
Ng was born on 10 May 1998 in Singapore. He attended Tao Nan School, Victoria School and Meridian Junior College. Ng attends Waseda University in Tokyo, Japan.

Ng is a fan of the Star Wars franchise and started fencing to emulate the characters in the movies.

Ng picked up fencing at age 8 when emulating the characters of the Star Wars franchise, which he is a fan.

He is the nephew of veteran actress, Huang Bi Ren.

International Awards
In addition to winning multiple National Championships and medals, Ng also had success on the international stage.

2013 Asian U17 Championships - Bronze
2013 Southeast Asian U17 Championships - Bronze
2014 Southeast Asian U20 Championships - Bronze
2014 Southeast Asian U17 Championships - Silver
2015 Asian U20 Championships - Bronze
2015 Asian U17 Championships - Silver
2017 Southeast Asian Games - Bronze
2018 Asian U20 Championships - Silver
2019 Southeast Asian Games - Gold

References

External links
https://web.archive.org/web/20160304130317/http://service.eurofencing.info/documents/vwn/jvc/lmh/CABRIES2013_FHC_equip.pdf
https://web.archive.org/web/20160304130331/http://service.eurofencing.info/documents/jlu/ctu/dsg/Haendelcup2014_Documentation_(1).pdf
http://www.channelnewsasia.com/news/singapore/fencer-jet-ng-clinches/1765524.html
http://www.asianfencing.com/fca2013/pdf/2015-cadet-mf.pdf
http://www.asianfencing.com/fca2013/pdf/10-MFT-CADET-AJCFC2013.pdf
http://www.asianfencing.com/fca2013/pdf/2015-cadet-mft.pdf
http://www.asianfencing.com/fca2013/pdf/2015-junior-mft.pdf
http://www.asianfencing.com/fca2013/pdf/2012All%20Cadet%20results.pdf
http://fie.org/fencers/fencer/28844
http://vs.moe.edu.sg/news073.html
http://southeastasiansports.blogspot.sg/2013/02/southeast-asian-fencing-federation.html

1998 births
Living people
Competitors at the 2019 Southeast Asian Games
Southeast Asian Games medalists in fencing
Southeast Asian Games gold medalists for Singapore